Alexe Rău, also transliterated from Russian as Alexei Rau (23 December 1953 — 8 April 2015), was a Moldovan philologist, library scientist, librarian, educator, editor, poet, essayist, and philosopher (Ph.D.). During 1992-2015 he was director of the National Library of Moldova.<ref
  name=murit>"A murit directorul Bibliotecii Naționale, Alexe Rău", Timpul April 8, 2015</ref>

Awards
Alexe Rău held several awards from the Union of Writers and Union of Artists, as well as other prizes awards and decorations:
Премия «Золотое перо» бухарестского журнала «Библиотека» за книговедческие эссе (1993)
Диплом ЮНЕСКО (2002)
Медаль Европейского Союза (2002)
Золотая медаль Фонда отличий в Женеве (2005)
 (1996)
 (2002)
Romanian Order For Merit, Commander's grade (2000)
Орден Почета (2010)
Премия Министерства культуры Республики Молдова (2011)
Трофей ЮНЕСКО (2012)
почетное звание «Заслуженный деятель культуры» (2012).

References

1953 births
2015 deaths
Moldovan poets
Male poets
Moldovan essayists
Library science scholars
Place of birth missing
Moldovan male writers